Human homeostatic iron regulator protein, also known as the HFE protein (High FE2+), is a protein which in humans is encoded by the HFE gene. The HFE gene is located on short arm of chromosome 6 at location 6p22.2

Function 
The protein encoded by this gene is a membrane protein that is similar to MHC class I-type proteins and associates with beta-2 microglobulin (beta2M). It is thought that this protein functions to regulate circulating iron uptake by regulating the interaction of the transferrin receptor with transferrin.

The HFE gene contains 7 exons spanning 12 kb. The full-length transcript represents 6 exons.

HFE protein is composed of 343 amino acids. There are several components, in sequence: a signal peptide (initial part of the protein), an extracellular transferrin receptor-binding region (α1 and α2), a portion that resembles immunoglobulin molecules (α3), a transmembrane region that anchors the protein in the cell membrane, and a short cytoplasmic tail.

HFE expression is subjected to alternative splicing. The predominant HFE full-length transcript has ~4.2 kb. Alternative HFE splicing variants may serve as iron regulatory mechanisms in specific cells or tissues.

HFE is prominent in small intestinal absorptive cells, gastric epithelial cells, tissue macrophages, and blood monocytes and granulocytes, and the syncytiotrophoblast, an iron transport tissue in the placenta.

Clinical significance 
The iron storage disorder hereditary hemochromatosis (HHC) is an autosomal recessive genetic disorder that usually results from defects in this gene.

The disease-causing genetic variant most commonly associated with hemochromatosis is p. C282Y. About 1/200 of people of Northern European origin have two copies of this variant; they, particularly males, are at high risk of developing hemochromatosis. This variant may also be one of the factors modifying Wilson's disease phenotype, making the symptoms of the disease appear earlier.

Allele frequencies of HFE C282Y in ethnically diverse western European white populations are 5-14% and in North American non-Hispanic whites are 6-7%. C282Y exists as a polymorphism only in Western European white and derivative populations, although C282Y may have arisen independently in non-whites outside Europe.

HFE H63D is cosmopolitan but occurs with greatest frequency in whites of European descent. Allele frequencies of H63D in ethnically diverse western European populations are 10-29%. and in North American non-Hispanic whites are 14-15%.

At least 42 mutations involving HFE introns and exons have been discovered, most of them in persons with hemochromatosis or their family members. Most of these mutations are rare. Many of the mutations cause or probably cause hemochromatosis phenotypes, often in compound heterozygosity with HFE C282Y. Other mutations are either synonymous or their effect on iron phenotypes, if any, has not been demonstrated.

Interactions 
The HFE protein interacts with the transferrin receptor TFRC.
Its primary mode of action is the regulation of the iron storage hormone hepcidin.

Hfe knockout mice 
It is possible to delete part or all of a gene of interest in mice (or other experimental animals) as a means of studying function of the gene and its protein. Such mice are called “knockouts” with respect to the deleted gene. Hfe is the mouse equivalent of the human hemochromatosis gene HFE. The protein encoded by Hfe is Hfe. Mice homozygous (two abnormal gene copies) for a targeted knockout of all six transcribed Hfe exons are designated Hfe−/−. Iron-related traits of Hfe−/− mice, including increased iron absorption and hepatic iron loading, are inherited in an autosomal recessive pattern. Thus, the Hfe−/− mouse model simulates important genetic and physiologic abnormalities of HFE hemochromatosis. Other knockout mice were created to delete the second and third Hfe exons (corresponding to α1 and α2 domains of Hfe). Mice homozygous for this deletion also had increased duodenal iron absorption, elevated plasma iron and transferrin saturation levels, and iron overload, mainly in hepatocytes. Mice have also been created that are homozygous for a missense mutation in Hfe (C282Y). These mice correspond to persons with hemochromatosis who are homozygous for HFE C282Y. These mice develop iron loading that is less severe than that of Hfe−/− mice.

HFE mutations and iron overload in other animals 
The black rhinoceros (Diceros bicornis) can develop iron overload. To determine whether the HFE gene of black rhinoceroses has undergone mutation as an adaptive mechanism to improve iron absorption from iron-poor diets, Beutler et al. sequenced the entire HFE coding region of four species of rhinoceros (two browsing and two grazing species). Although HFE was well conserved across the species, numerous nucleotide differences were found between rhinoceros and human or mouse, some of which changed deduced amino acids. Only one allele, p.S88T in the black rhinoceros, was a candidate that might adversely affect HFE function. p.S88T occurs in a highly conserved region involved in the interaction of HFE and TfR1.

See also
HFE H63D gene mutation
Hereditary haemochromatosis

Notes

References

Further reading

External links 
 
 

Genes on human chromosome 6